The Immature is a 2011 Italian comedy film directed by Paolo Genovese. The film was a commercial success, grossing over 19 million dollars at the Italian box office. It was nominated for three David di Donatello and for four Nastri d'Argento Awards.

A sequel, The Immature: The Trip, was released in 2012.

Plot summary 
A group of young guys meet again them after so many years of their separation from the classes of the high school classic. Each of them has a family, or still lives the anxiety of teenagers, trying to get by in life. But one day the young people discover the news that the examination made by them at the end of high school is not valid for bureaucratic complications. They will have to go back to school as students to retake the exam, so that the degrees and diplomas who have taken are permanently valid. During the summer study, the protagonists have the chance to relive the passions of the past, which now only teenagers can remember and try.

Cast 
 Raoul Bova as Giorgio Romanini
 Barbora Bobuľová as Luisa
 Ambra Angiolini as Francesca
 Luca Bizzarri as Piero Galeazzi
 Paolo Kessisoglu as Virgilio
 Ricky Memphis as Lorenzo Coppetti
 Luisa Ranieri as Marta
 Anita Caprioli as Eleonora
 Giulia Michelini as Cinzia
 Isabelle Adriani as Samantha
 Alessandro Tiberi as Ivano
 Giovanna Ralli as Iole 
 Maurizio Mattioli as Luigi

TV Series
In 2017 Mediaset announced the TV show Immaturi la serie

See also   
 List of Italian films of 2011

References

External links

2011 films
Italian comedy films
2011 comedy films
Films directed by Paolo Genovese
2010s Italian-language films
2010s Italian films